Morgenhyrderne was a morning show on the Danish radio channel Radio 100FM. The show featured Lasse Rimmer, Lars Hjortshøj and Andrea Elisabeth Rudolph and broadcast every weekday morning.

The hosts discussed news stories - typically politics, gossip, and music - and commented on them in a humorous way. Highlights from the show were repeated on Radio 100FM through the day and especially in the weekends.

Cast 

The original cast was Lasse Rimmer, Lars Hjortshøj and Andrea Elisabeth Rudolph.

In May 2006, Signe Muusmann came to replace Andrea Elisabeth Rudolph due to pregnancy and dissatisfaction with the terms of parental leave offered by Radio 100FM.

In late-October, Lars Hjortshøj resigned his position at Radio 100FM in favor of employment at TV2 Radio. In his place, Simon Jul Jørgensen began in early-January 2007.

Awards 

In 2005, the original cast was awarded the Danish Radio Prize.

External links
 The official Radio 100FM Morgenhyrderne page

Danish radio programmes